Albert G Boyd (November 22, 1906 – September 18, 1976) was a pioneering test pilot for the United States Air Force (USAF). During his 30-year career, he logged more than 23,000 hours of flight time in 723 military aircraft (though this number of the total number flown includes variants and sub variants of some types, and is not 723 distinct types). When he retired in 1957, he had flown every aircraft type operated by the USAF, including attack, cargo, trainer, fighter, experimental, bomber, mission trainer, liaison, observation, and general aviation planes and helicopters.

From 1947 to 1957, Boyd flew and approved every aircraft type acquired by the USAF. When he retired, he was praised as the "Father of Modern Flight Testing," "World's Number One Test Pilot," "Dean of American Test Pilots" and "Father of USAF Test Pilots."

His assignments included:
 Chief of Flight Section at Wright-Patterson AFB
 Commander of Experimental Test Pilot School
 First commander of USAF Flight Test Center at Edwards Air Force Base
 Commander of Wright Air Development Center (Maj. Chuck Yeager, a test pilot in his command, was the first American pilot to test the MiG-15, associated with Operation Moolah.)
 Deputy commander of Weapons System Headquarters, Air Research and Development Command
 Commanding general of Edwards AFB

The prototype Lockheed P-80 Shooting Star, modified as a racer and designated P-80R, was piloted by Colonel Boyd to 623.73 mph (1,004.2 km/h) on 19 June 1947. This was recognised as an official air speed record, although this speed had already been exceeded by the Me 163 and Me 262 in 1944.

Boyd led the newly formed Air Force's X-1 supersonic flight program and made the selection of Chuck Yeager to pilot the plane.  Yeager described Boyd as a strict disciplinarian who would enforce (often with a very loud voice) USAF uniform regulations.  He remarked that "You might be his star pilot, but Lord help you if you came before him in his office with an un-shined belt buckle".  Boyd was highly respected by his subordinates.

Boyd died on September 18, 1976. He and his wife Anna Lu (1907–1981) are buried at Arlington National Cemetery.

Awards
 Octave Chanute Award
 Legion of Merit
 Distinguished Flying Cross
 Distinguished Service Medal
 Air Power Trophy
 Schilling Award
 Médaille de l'Aéronautique
 Brevet Militarire de Pilote d'Aviation
 Aerospace Walk of Honor (1991)
 Inducted into the National Aviation Hall of Fame in 1984.

References

 City of Lancaster AWOH biography retrieved February 5, 2011.
 Air Force Link Biography retrieved February 5, 2011.

External links

 Albert Boyd at ArlingtonCemetery.net, an unofficial website

1906 births
1976 deaths
American aviators
American test pilots
Aviators from Tennessee
Recipients of the Distinguished Service Medal (US Army)
Recipients of the Distinguished Flying Cross (United States)
Recipients of the Legion of Merit
Recipients of the Aeronautical Medal
United States Air Force generals
American aviation record holders
Burials at Arlington National Cemetery